The Oerlikon 30 mm twin cannon is an anti aircraft gun, incorporating two Oerlikon KCB, used by the Royal Navy. They were fitted to Type 42 destroyers after the Falklands War to improve defence against air attack.

References

Naval anti-aircraft guns
30 mm artillery